Alexander Artemiev (Chuvash and ; 14 Sept 1924 – 5 August 1998.), was a Chuvash poet, prose writer, translator and critic.

Biography
Artemiev attended secondary school in the Shtanashi village of Chuvashia. He enlisted in the Red Army as a private, and then became a junior commander during the Eastern Front of World War II, as well as for the later Soviet-Japanese War. He was wounded three times during his service, and was awarded many medals.

After demobilization, he worked managing a log hut-reading room in his native village, becoming responsible secretary of magazines "Yalav"(Ялав) and "Tavan Atal". He also participated in distance learning from the Maxim Gorky Literature Institute, studying and publishing poetry. Among his most popular works are: «Ах, пӗлесчӗ» (Ah to know), «Ҫуралнӑ ҫӗршыв» (the Darling party), and «Салампи юрри» (Salampi's song). Alexander Artemyev also translated some of Alexander Pushkin's, Mikhail Lermontov's and Ivan Turgenev's works into the Chuvash language.

Well-known works 
 «Суйласа илнисем», икӗ томлӑ, (Selected works, in 2 volumes) 1986);
 «Юлашки юрӑ» (Final song) (1981);
 «Салампи» - Salampee(1956, 1960, 1966, 1983);

Literature 
 Efimov L. I., "Элӗк Енӗ" (Alikovo District), Alikovo, 1994.
 "Аликовская энциклопедия", editing: Efimov L. I., Efimov E. L., Anan'ev A. A., Terernt'ev G. K., Cheboksary, 2009, .
 «Чӑваш литературин антологийӗ», editing: Gordeev D. V., Silem J. A. Cheboksary, 2003.  .
 «Литературы народов России: XX в.» Н. С. Надъярных, Moscow Наука, 2005

References

Links 
 Культурное наследие Чувашии
 Александр Артемьева асăнса

1924 births
1998 deaths
Chuvash writers
Chuvash-language poets
People from Alikovsky District
20th-century poets
Soviet writers
Soviet poets
Maxim Gorky Literature Institute alumni
Soviet military personnel of World War II